Naval Base Banika Island was a United States Navy base built during World War II on Mbanika Island in the Russell Islands, part of the Solomon Islands. A larger supply depot was built to support the ships fighting in the Pacific War. Also built were a repair base for landing craft, PT boats, and other boats. Banika Island offered excellent fleet anchorage. Banika Island was taken during the Solomon Islands campaign. Also at the base was built the Renard Sound Seaplane Base.

History
US Navy Seabee Construction Battalions built the base starting in February 1943. Seabee 33rd Battalion, 35th Battalion and other Construction Battalions built the Naval Base and much of the airfields on Banika Island. Enemy planes bombed one of the Naval Base Banika Island's tank farms on June 25, 1943. One 1,000-barrel tank was destroyed by fire. Three had shrapnel damage. The pipelines to the port and airfields were damaged. It took the Seabees five days to repair the damages. The airfields remain open during the repair work. In all air attacks, four Seabees were killed. A pontoon bridge was built from Banika Island's Renard Sound to Pavuvu Island. On Pavuvu Island a barge landing dock was built. The complete base was completed by November 1943. In the fall of 1943, the port was turned over for operation to the 6th Seabee Battalion and 9th Special Battalion. Operations were turned over to the 11th Battalion and the 12th Special Battalion in February 1944. The 93rd Battalion built Naval Mobile Hospital - MOB 10 with 1300-beds. A pontoon assembly depot was built, it took a lot less space in the ships to transport the pontoons in flat parts. The pontoon assembly depot was run by the 20th Battalion - PAD 2. Seabee built two airfields on the island Banika Field, used by US Navy, United States Army Air Forces (USAAF) and United States Marine Corps and Renard Field. By February 1945 Naval Base Banika Island was no longer in the front line of action and parts of the base were packed up and sent to move Advance Bases. Naval Mobile Hospital - MOB 10 was one of the first units to be shipped out. Much of the base was shipped over a four-month span. The base was closed and abandoned after the war.

Bases and facilities
300-foot pier
Radar station
Naval hospital
Naval hospital dispensary  
Naval Mobile Hospital - MOB 10
Fleet Post Office FPO# 60 SF Russell Islands
Naval Recovery hospital
Naval training center
Supply Depot
Seabee Camp
Seabee depot - Advanced Base Construction Depot (ABCD)
Seabee sawmill 
Repair Depot
Coral quarry
Repair base camp, barracks and mess hall
Power plant
PT boat Base
Machine shops
Ammunition depot
Aviation gasoline Tank farm
Blue Beach landing mats for LST ships and LCT craft
Yellow Beach landing mats
Two-lane coral road around Banika Island (connect beaches to port)
Tillotson Cove, two 432-foot pontoon docks 
Pontoon assembly depot 
Pavuvu Island a barge landing dock
VMF -121 and VMF(N)-531 United States Marine Corps unit camp

Airfields
The airfields were used to attack the Empire of Japan on New Georgia and Munda.
Banika Field, used by US Navy for Interstate TDR  United States Army Air Forces (USAAF) and United States Marine Corps 
Renard Field used by USAAF and US Navy VB-140 and VB-148, both with  Lockheed Ventura PV-1

Renard Sound Seaplane Base
Near Banika Field, in the channel to the east of the runway, the US Navy operated the Renard Sound Seaplane Base. The Base was at

Seabee units
Seabee units that spent time at Naval Base Banika Island:
33rd Battalion
35th Battalion 
93rd Battalion
6th Seabee Battalion
9th Special Battalions
20th Battalion
24th Battalion
35th Battalion
36th Battalion
87th Battalion
11th Battalion
12th Special Battalion 
CBMU 503
CBMU 571
CBMU 572
CBMU 573
CBMU 501
CBMU 580
CBMU 503
CBMU 550
ACORN 15
Bobcat 15
Bobcat 24
Bobcat 33
Bobcat 36
PAD 2
1054 CBD

See also

US Naval Base Solomons
New Guinea campaign
New Britain campaign
US Naval Advance Bases

External links
youtube, A runway strip under construction by Seabees at Banika Island during War II
youtube, Military Secrets of Banika Atoll

References

Naval Stations of the United States Navy
World War II airfields in the Pacific Ocean Theater
Airfields of the United States Navy
Military installations closed in the 1940s
Closed installations of the United States Navy